Squash is an event at the Island Games, the biennial multi-sports event for island nations, territories and dependencies.

Squash at the Island Games was first time played in 2005.

 Men's Singles - a maximum of 3 competitors per Member Island
 Women's Singles - a maximum of 3 competitors per Member Island
 Men's Doubles - a maximum of 1 pair per Member Island
 Women's Doubles - a maximum of 1 pair per Member Island
 Mixed Doubles - a maximum of 1 pair per Member Island
 Team Event - a maximum of 1 pair per Member Island
 Age - minimum 13

Events

Top Medalists

Men's

Men's singles

Men's doubles

Women's

Women's singles

Women's doubles

Mixed doubles

Team Event

References 

 
Sports at the Island Games
Island Games